Haim Cohen may refer to:

Haim Cohn (1911–2002), Israeli jurist and author, sometimes referred to as Haim Cohen
Haim Cohen-Meguri (1913–2000), Israeli member of Knesset for Herut and Gahal
Haim Cohen (chef) (born 1960), Israeli chef, restauranteur and TV personality